Eoghan Connolly is an Irish sportsperson.  He plays hurling with his local club Cashel King Cormacs and with the Tipperary senior inter-county team since 2021.

Career
Connolly made his league debut on 13 June 2021 against Waterford when he came on as a late substitute.

Honours
Tipperary
All-Ireland Under-21 Hurling Championship (1): 2018

References

Tipperary inter-county hurlers
Living people
Year of birth missing (living people)